Chania is a city of Greece.

Chania may also refer to:

 Chania (constituency), a constituency of the Hellenic Parliament
 Chania (regional unit), a regional unit of Crete
 Chania International Airport

See also